Bangaly Keita (born 1 May 1993) is a Guinean footballer who plays as a centre back for Equatorial Guinean club Futuro Kings FC. He has been a member of the Guinea national team.

References

1993 births
Living people
Sportspeople from Conakry
Guinean footballers
Association football central defenders
Hafia FC players
Tunisian Ligue Professionnelle 1 players
JS Kairouan players
Botola players
Hassania Agadir players
South African Premier Division players
Free State Stars F.C. players
Chippa United F.C. players
National First Division players
Royal Eagles F.C. players
Futuro Kings FC players
Guinea international footballers
Guinean expatriate footballers
Guinean expatriate sportspeople in Tunisia
Expatriate footballers in Tunisia
Guinean expatriate sportspeople in Morocco
Expatriate footballers in Morocco
Guinean expatriates in South Africa
Expatriate soccer players in South Africa
Guinean expatriates in Equatorial Guinea
Expatriate footballers in Equatorial Guinea